Sarah L. Pett is a Professor of Infectious Diseases at University College London. Pett is interested in the immunopathology of infections and the development of optimised treatment pathways for infections. During the COVID-19 pandemic, Pett led a clinical trial that investigated the efficacy of remdesivir as a treatment for coronavirus disease.

Research and career 
In 2000 Pett joined the Kirby Institute, where she led international randomized controlled trials. In 2013 Pett joined the Medical Research Council Clinical Trials Unit at University College London. She was promoted to the Chair of the Infectious Diseases theme in 2016. 

During the COVID-19 pandemic Pett led the Adaptive COVID-19 Treatment Trial (ACTT-EU/UK), a clinical trial into the efficacy of remdesivir as a treatment from coronavirus disease. Adult inpatients were given remdesivir or a placebo through a drip for up to ten days of their stay in hospital. Pett showed that patients treated with remdesivir recovered 31% faster than those who did not receive treatment.

Selected publications

References 

Living people
Year of birth missing (living people)
Alumni of the University of Edinburgh
COVID-19 researchers
Academics of University College London
British medical researchers
Medical Research Council (United Kingdom) people
Women medical researchers